Hamid Olimjon (sometimes spelled Hamid Alimjan in English; ; ; 12 December 1909 – 3 July 1944) was an Uzbek poet, playwright, scholar, and literary translator of the Soviet period. Hamid Olimjon is considered to be one of the finest twentieth-century Uzbek poets. The Uzbek Soviet Encyclopedia calls him "one of the founders of Uzbek Soviet literature". In addition to writing his own poetry, Hamid Olimjon translated the works of many famous foreign authors, such as Alexander Pushkin, Leo Tolstoy, Maxim Gorky, Vladimir Mayakovsky, Taras Shevchenko, and Mikhail Lermontov into the Uzbek language.

Hamid Olimjon was married to the renowned Uzbek poet Zulfiya. He died in a car accident on 3 July 1944, in Tashkent. He was 34 years old at the time of his death.

Life 
Hamid Olimjon was born on 12 December 1909 in Jizzakh. Hamid Olimjon's father died when he was only four years old. From 1918 until 1923, he studied at Narimonov Elementary School in Jizzakh.

Hamid Olimjon studied at the Samarkand Pedagogical University from 1923 until 1928. From 1928 until 1931, he studied at the Uzbek Pedagogical Academy. Hamid Olimjon became a member of the Communist Party of the Soviet Union in 1942.

In 1935, Hamid Olimjon married the renowned Uzbek poet Zulfiya. He died in a car accident on 3 July 1944, in Tashkent. He was 34 years old at the time of his death.

Work 
Hamid Olimjon started to write poetry during his student years. In 1926, he published his works in the Zarafshon newspaper. In 1927, he became an editor of that newspaper.

Hamid Olimjon's first collection of poems, Koʻklam (The Spring), was published in 1929. He also published many other collections of poetry, including Tong shabadasi (Morning Breeze) (1930), Olov sochlar (Fiery Hair) (1931),  (Death to the Enemy) (1932), Poyga (The Race) (1932), Daryo kechasi (The River's Night) (1936), Chirchiq sohillarida (On the Banks of Chirchiq) (1937), Sheʼrlar (Poems) (1937), Oʻlka (Country) (1939), Baxt (Happiness) (1940), Qoʻlingga qurol ol! (Take up a Weapon!) (1942), Ona va oʻgʻil (Mother and Son) (1942), and Ishonch (Trust) (1943). In 1928, he wrote two collections of short stories, namely Tong shabadasi (Morning Breeze) and Haqiqat izlab (Seeking Truth).

He also collected and published the Uzbek epic poem Alpomish for the first time in 1938.

Hamid Olimjon also authored plays that remain popular to this day in Uzbek theaters. Among his most famous plays are Muqanna and Jinoyat (The Crime).

In addition to writing his own poetry, Hamid Olimjon translated the works of many famous foreign authors, such as Alexander Pushkin, Alexander Serafimovich, Konstantin Simonov, Leo Tolstoy, Lord Byron, Maxim Gorky, Mikhail Lermontov, Mikhail Svetlov, Nikolai Ostrovsky, Oleksandr Korniychuk, Pavlo Tychyna, Taras Shevchenko, Vera Inber, and Vladimir Mayakovsky into the Uzbek language. Hamid Olimjon's works in turn have been translated into many other languages.

Hamid Olimjon extensively studied Uzbek classic literature. In 1943, he became a correspondent member of the Academy of Sciences of the Uzbek SSR. As a member of the committee that was established to celebrate the 500th anniversary of Ali-Shir Nava'i's birth, Hamid Olimjon studied Nava'i's life and work and published numerous scholarly articles on this subject. He also played an important role in translating Nava'i's works into Russian. Hamid Olimjon became executive secretary of the Writers' Union of the Uzbek SSR in 1939 and held this position until his death in 1944.

Heritage and legacy 
Many institutions in Uzbekistan are named after Hamid Olimjon. A station of Tashkent Metro, a building of Uzbekistan's Writers' Union, Samarkand Province Theater — all are named after him.

References

Bibliography 
 .
 .
 .

External links
Hamid Olimjon's works 

1909 births
1944 deaths
People from Jizzakh
Communist Party of the Soviet Union members
Translators from Russian
Translators to Uzbek
Uzbekistani translators
Uzbekistani male poets
20th-century Uzbekistani poets
20th-century translators
Soviet poets
Road incident deaths in Uzbekistan
Road incident deaths in the Soviet Union